Janice "Jan" Meek FRGS (formerly Cooper and Byles, born 1944) is a British adventurer and ocean rower. In 1997 she took part in the first ever Atlantic Rowing Race, the Port St Charles Barbados Atlantic Rowing Race. Meek successfully crossed the Atlantic Ocean unsupported in  wooden rowing boat in 101 days with her son Daniel Byles.  She currently holds four Guinness World Records.

Career
Meek has owned and run several restaurants, including De Courceys in South Wales, and has been a wedding organiser and events manager.

Adventures and expeditions

Atlantic rowing race 1997
Meek and her son Daniel Byles participated in the first ocean rowing race rowed  from Tenerife to Barbados. In rowing across the Atlantic, the pair achieved two Guinness World Records: they became the first mother and son team to row any ocean, and, At 53, Meek became the oldest person at the time to row across any ocean. In 2005 this record would be broken broken by Pavel Rezvoy (66).

In 2006 Meek and her son Daniel Byles were belatedly awarded a Guinness World Record certificate for being the first mother and son team to row any ocean in 1997/8.

In 2007 she and her son walked and skied  from Resolute, Nunavut to the Magnetic North Pole in 20 days and 5 hours.

References

External links
 Jan Meek's website

1944 births
Living people
British explorers
British female rowers
Ocean rowers
Fellows of the Royal Geographical Society
People from Chipping Norton